Matea Ikić (born 25 May 1989) is a Croatian volleyball player. She plays as outside hitter for Turkish club Adam Voleybol.

International career 
She is a member of the Croatia women's national volleyball team. She competed at the 2018 FIVB Volleyball Women's Club World Championship, and 2021 Women's European Volleyball League, winning a silver medal.

References

External links
Matea Ikić at CEV.eu

1989 births
Living people
Croatian women's volleyball players
Sportspeople from Pula
Expatriate volleyball players in Italy
Expatriate volleyball players in Poland
Expatriate volleyball players in Romania
Expatriate volleyball players in France
Expatriate volleyball players in Kazakhstan
Expatriate volleyball players in Turkey